←2007 - 2008 - 2009→

This is a list of Japanese television dramas often called doramas by fans.

The list is not complete, and aims to include all those Japanese television dramas that are somehow of interest for Wikipedia contents.

2008 Winter season
Series

2008 Spring season
Series

Specials
 Attention Please: Sydney - starring Ueto Aya, Nishikido Ryo
 SP
 Proposal Daisakusen (aka Operation Love) SP - starring Yamashita Tomohisa, Nagasawa Masami

2008 Summer season
Series

2008 Autumn season
Series

See also
 List of Japanese television dramas

 List of Japanese Television Dramas
Dramas, 2008